Shining pondweed is a common name for several plants and may refer to:

Potamogeton illinoensis, native to North America
Potamogeton lucens, native to Eurasia and north Africa